The term Green care may refer to:

 Care farming
 Horticultural therapy
 Services supporting individuals or organisations to become more environmentally friendly
 Services and products related to gardening